Eriochilus valens, commonly known as the red-lipped bunny orchid, is a plant in the orchid family Orchidaceae and is endemic to Western Australia. It has a single egg-shaped leaf held above the ground and up to four small pink or white and pink flowers. It grows near winter-west swamps and usually only flowers after fire the previous summer.

Description
Flowering occurs from March to May but is much more prolific after fire the previous summer.

Taxonomy and naming
Eriochilus valens was first formally described in 2006 by Stephen Hopper and Andrew Brown from a specimen collected in the Bakers Junction Nature Reserve north of Albany and the description was published in Nuytsia. The specific epithet (valens) is a Latin word meaning "strong" or "vigorous", referring to the large labellum of this orchid.

Distribution and habitat
The red-lipped bunny orchid grows in woodland and shrubland around winter-wet swamps, mainly between Walpole and Albany.

Conservation
Eriochilus valens is classified as "not threatened" by the Western Australian Government Department of Parks and Wildlife.

References

valens
Orchids of Western Australia
Endemic orchids of Australia
Plants described in 2006
Endemic flora of Western Australia
Taxa named by Stephen Hopper